Sarah Schechter is an American television and film producer. Schechter is the chairperson and partner at Berlanti Productions, and the co-founder of Berlanti-Schechter Films.

In October 2020, with 17 scripted series then on the air, she became one of the most prolific producers in television history.

Early life and education
Schechter was born in Boston and grew up in Brookline, Massachusetts and New York City. Her father, Danny Schechter, a grandson of Russian-Jewish immigrant socialists, was a human rights activist, author, filmmaker and television producer.

She attended the preparatory school Milton Academy, and in 1998 graduated from UC Santa Cruz with a degree in film theory.

Career
Schechter began her career in New York, working for the documentarian Barbara Kopple and on independent film projects. She later moved to Los Angeles, where she spent six years working for the producer Barry Mendel, and nine years as a development executive at Warner Bros. Television.

Schechter begin working with Greg Berlanti on Life as We Know It, and in 2014 was named president of Berlanti Productions. In February 2020, she was promoted to partner and chairperson.

Schechter has produced over 17 television series, and produced My Policeman, Unpregnant, Free Guy and Alice & Freda Forever.

Selected credits
 Superman & Lois
 Riverdale
 Katy Keene
 Gotham Knights
 Doom Patrol
 Titans
 Chilling Adventures of Sabrina
 Batwoman
 Black Lightning
 Supergirl
 The Flight Attendant
 Legends of Tomorrow
 The Flash
 Arrow
 Kung Fu
 Her
 Gran Torino
 Moonshot
 Helter Skelter: An American Myth
 Equal

References

External links
 

Television producers from Massachusetts
People from Brookline, Massachusetts
American film producers
University of California, Santa Cruz alumni
1976 births
Living people